Riverdale is a village in Cook County, Illinois, United States. The population was 10,663 at the 2020 census. The village shares its name with the bordering Riverdale neighborhood in Chicago.

Geography

Riverdale is located at  (41.640684, -87.630645).

Surrounding areas
 Chicago 
 Calumet Park    Chicago 
 Blue Island   Dolton
 Dixmoor    Dolton
 Harvey / Dolton

Demographics
As of the 2020 census there were 10,663 people, 4,472 households, and 2,726 families residing in the village. The racial makeup of the village was 3.17% White, 92.20% African American, 0.33% Native American, 0.15% Asian, 0.12% Pacific Islander, 1.73% from other races, and 2.31% from two or more races. Hispanic or Latino of any race were 3.19% of the population.

There were 4,472 households, out of which 68.31% had children under the age of 18 living with them, 20.91% were married couples living together, 34.44% had a female householder with no husband present, and 39.04% were non-families. 33.09% of all households were made up of individuals, and 8.74% had someone living alone who was 65 years of age or older. The average household size was 3.73 and the average family size was 2.79.

The village's age distribution consisted of 31.4% under the age of 18, 10.1% from 18 to 24, 24.8% from 25 to 44, 24.4% from 45 to 64, and 9.2% who were 65 years of age or older. The median age was 32.2 years. For every 100 females, there were 89.8 males. For every 100 females age 18 and over, there were 77.8 males.

The median income for a household in the village was $38,355, and the median income for a family was $42,632. Males had a median income of $36,231 versus $30,861 for females. The per capita income for the village was $18,987. About 27.2% of families and 28.0% of the population were below the poverty line, including 37.9% of those under age 18 and 17.0% of those age 65 or over.

Note: the US Census treats Hispanic/Latino as an ethnic category. This table excludes Latinos from the racial categories and assigns them to a separate category. Hispanics/Latinos can be of any race.

Government
Riverdale is divided between two congressional districts. Most of the city is in Illinois's 2nd congressional district; the area west of Ashland Avenue and the area southwest of 141st and Halsted Streets are in the 1st district. The local government of Riverdale consists of six elected trustees, one elected village clerk, and one elected mayor. On April 9, 2013, incumbent mayor Deyon Dean was defeated by trustee Lawrence Jackson, who was sworn in as mayor of Riverdale on May 2, 2013.

Notable people 

 Marcheline Bertrand, actress; mother of actress Angelina Jolie; grew up in Riverdale
 Antwaan Randle El, wide receiver for the Washington Redskins and Pittsburgh Steelers; Super Bowl champion (XL); born in Riverdale
 Charles Christian Hammer, classical guitarist 
 Marjorie Pebworth, Illinois politician; lived in Riverdale
 Betty Robinson, Olympic gold medalist in the 100 and 400 meter relays (1928 & 1936); born in Riverdale
 Steamboat Struss, pitcher for the Pittsburgh Pirates; born in Riverdale
 Joseph C. Szabo, 12th Administrator of the Federal Railroad Administration; previously served as a Village Trustee and Village President of Riverdale

References

External links

 Village of Riverdale official website

Villages in Illinois
Villages in Cook County, Illinois
Chicago metropolitan area

Majority-minority cities and towns in Cook County, Illinois